Gǔ is a Chinese surname meaning "old" or "ancient."

Notable people
 Gu Long, pen name of Xiong Yaohua (7 June 1938 – 21 September 1985), a Chinese novelist, screenwriter, film producer and director based in Taiwan
 Leo Ku is a Hong Kong Cantopop and Mandopop singer, actor, TV host, model, cartoonist, MV director, and producer and designer
 Ku Chin-shui (Chinese: 古金水, 1960–2016) was an Amis Taiwanese decathlete and pole vaulter
 Gu Li (Chinese: 古力; Pinyin: Gǔ Lì; born February 3, 1983) is a Chinese professional Go player
 Louis Koo (古天樂; born 21 October 1970) is a Hong Kong actor and film producer
 Ko Tin Lung (Chinese: 古天農, 1954–2022) is a Hong Kong film producer
 Koo Sze-yiu (古思堯; born 1949) is a Hong Kong activists and policticans
 Victor Koo or Gu Yongqiang (Chinese: 古永鏘; pinyin: Gǔ Yǒngqiāng; born 1966) served as president Sohu.com before leaving to co-found video website Youku

Chinese-language surnames
Individual Chinese surnames